Leonard Walker Lovett  (July 17, 1852 in Lancaster County, Pennsylvania – November 18, 1922 in Newark, Delaware) was an outfielder who played in one game in 1873 as a pitcher and six games in 1875 as an outfielder in Major League Baseball.

Sources

1852 births
1922 deaths
19th-century baseball players
Baseball players from Pennsylvania
Major League Baseball right fielders
Elizabeth Resolutes players
Philadelphia Centennials players